The North American Challenge Skate was a series of annual summer figure skating competitions for American and Canadian figure skaters on the novice and junior levels.  It was a developmental program rather than an elite competition series; the purpose of the program was to give young skaters a chance to compete internationally and hone their skills.  The events began in 1996 and consisted of two to four competitions each year, split between the US and Canada. The competitions were jointly sponsored by Skate Canada and the USFSA, rather than being international competitions sanctioned by the International Skating Union. Skaters competed in four disciplines across the two levels: men's singles, ladies singles, pairs, and ice dance. The competition was also open to invited skaters from Mexico.

Each federation had its own criteria for team selection.

The series was discontinued after the 2006 events due to budget cuts.

In 2018 NACS was revived by Skate Canada and USFS as the "North American Series". This series of competitions will be limited to novice level skaters. A maximum of 6 men, 6 ladies, 4 pairs, and 5 ice dancers per nation per event will compete at the three events. For the 2018-2019 season these are Skate Milwaukee in Milwaukee, Wisconsin, July 11-15, 2018, Lake Placid Ice Dance Competition in Lake Placid, New York, July 24-27, 2018 and Sectional Series- GTSA Summer Skate in Toronto (North York), Ontario, August 16-19, 2018.

References

Figure skating competitions